The 1st Congress of the CP(b)U (Communist Party of Ukraine (Soviet Union)) was held in Moscow in July 5–12, 1918. It was a constituent congress which led to creation of the political party by way of uniting existing Russian Bolsheviks in Ukraine and left faction of the Ukrainian Social-Democrats. The congress took place at address ulica Rozhdestvenka, 11 (later ulica Zhdanova). Today in the building is located MArchI (Moscow Architectural Institute).

The 65 plenipotentiary and 147 consultative delegates represented 45 Party organizations that were accounted for over 4,000 Party members. The congress also attended about 60 guests.

On 6 July 1918 delegates of the Congress with arms in hands participated in liquidation of the Left SR uprising in Moscow.

Preceding events and preparation

An instruction on creation of a single Bolshevik organization in Ukraine the Central Committee of the Russian Communist Party (b) has adopted in December 1917. It was realized at a regional congress of the RSDRP (b) in Kyiv on 16–18 December 1917 when the Ukrainian organization was named as the RSDRP (b) – Social-Democracy of Ukraine.

Couple of weeks after signing of the Treaty of Brest-Litovsk, on 19 March 1918 in Yekaterinoslav (Dnipro) had convened the Second All-Ukrainian Congress of Soviets where the congress discussed and approved the treaty and also announced that Ukraine only formally loosening its federative ties with the Soviet Russia and workers of Ukraine will carry on a fight against the restored bourgeoisie regime. Recognition of Ukrainian independence was forced onto the Soviet Russia by the Treaty of Brest-Litovsk. A cordial greeting about the declaration of independence of the "Ukrainian Federative Soviet Republic" was published in the Russian newspaper Pravda on 22 March 1918. Upon conclusion of the congress many members of the congress emigrated to Taganrog where at that time dominated Ukrainian population.

Agenda
Report of the Organization Bureau on convening the First Congress of the CP(b)U (delivered by Nikolay Skripnik)
Report of the All-Ukrainian partisan provisional committee (delivered by Mikhail Mayorov)
Report of the Bolshevik faction in the People's Secretariat (delivered by Andrei Bubnov)
About the current moment (delivered by Yuriy Pyatakov)
About armed uprising (delivered by Andrei Bubnov)
About state relations of Soviet Ukraine with Soviet Russia (delivered by Emmanuel Kviring)
About attitudes towards to so called "Soviets" (Radas)
About attitudes towards other political parties (delivered by Vladimir Zatonskiy)
About merging with left faction of the Ukrainian Social Democrats (Ukrainian Social Democratic Labour Party)
About the Party (delivered by Nikolay Skripnik)
About organizational issues (delivered by Nikolay Skripnik)
About elections to the Central Committee

Central Committee
The Contress elected the following members to the Central Committee on 12 July 1918: 

Elected Members
Amosov Ivan Karpovich
Bubnov Andrei Sergeevich
Butsenko Afanasiy Ivanovich
Gruzman Shulim Aizikovich
Zatonskiy Vladimir Petrovich
Kartvelishvili Lavrentiy Iosifovich
Kviring Emmanuil Ionovich
Kosior Stanislav Vikentievich
Kreisberg Isaac Mironovich
Lutovinov Yuriy Khrisanfovich
Pyatakov Yuriy Leonidovich
Rafail (Farbman Rafail Borisovich)
Rovner Pinkhus Lazarevich
Tarskiy (Sokolovskiy) Leonid Lvovich
Schwartz Isaac Izrailevich

Candidates 
Gamarnik Jan Borisovich
Lebed Dmitriy Zakharovich
Mayorov Mikhail Moiseevich (Biberman Meer Moiseevich)
Skripnik Nikolay Alekseevich
Slinko Petr Fedorovich
Yakovlev (Epstein) Yakov Arkadievich

The same day on 12 July 1918 took place a plenum (plenary session) of the Central Committee that elected Yuriy Pyatakov as the Secretary of the Central Committee (see First Secretary of the Communist Party of Ukraine).

The Central Committee plenums
 12 July 1918
 8–9 September 1918
 16 October 1918

See also
 7th Congress of the Russian Communist Party (Bolsheviks)

Further reading
 Комуністична партія України в резолюціях і рішеннях з'їздів, конференцій і пленумів ЦК, т. 1. К., 1976
 Нариси історії Комуністичної партії України. К., 1977
 Рядніна У. Перший з'їзд КП(б)У. К., 1958
 Мельниченко В. Ю. Бойовий загін єдиної ленінської партії. К., 1978

References

External links
Melnychenko, V. 1st Congress of the Communist Party (Bolshevik) of Ukraine (ПЕРШИЙ З'ЇЗД КП(Б) УКРАЇНИ). Ukrainian Soviet Encyclopedia (leksika.com.ua)
Melnychenko, V. Taganrog Conference of Bolsheviks of Ukraine (ТАГАНРОЗЬКА НАРАДА БІЛЬШОВИКІВ УКРАЇНИ). Ukrainian Soviet Encyclopedia (leksika.com.ua)
The 1918 All-Ukrainian Conference of underground Bolshevik organizations (ВСЕУКРАЇНСЬКА НАРАДА ПІДПІЛЬНИХ БІЛЬШОВИЦЬКИХ ОРГАНІЗАЦІЙ 1918). Ukrainian Soviet Encyclopedia (leksika.com.ua)
 Центральный Комитет, избранный I-м съездом КП(б) Украины 12.7.1918, члены и кандидаты в члены. Handbook on History of the Communist Party and the Soviet Union 1898–1991 (www.knowbysight.info)
 Dmytro Shurkhalo. How 100 years ago in Moscow they created CP(b)U (Як 100 років тому у Москві створили КП(б)У). Radio Liberty. 12 August 2018.

Communist Party of Ukraine (Soviet Union)
1918 in Russia
1918 conferences
July 1918 events